Elliott Wilson may refer to:

 Elliott Wilson (cricketer) (born 1976), former English cricketer
 Elliott Wilson (journalist) (born 1971), American journalist, television producer and hip-hop magazine editor

See also
 Elliot Wilson (born 1979), English cricketer